Csilla Borsányi (born 2 August 1987 in Siófok) is a Hungarian former tennis player. She attended University of Florida as a student athlete, and played for the gators for two seasons from August 2006 to May 2008. She continued her studies at Baylor University in Waco, Texas. Borsányi was the Newcomer of the year in the BIG XII Conference in 2009. She was on the team that became number one in Division I ranking in 2010 for the first time in Baylor History. She graduated in May 2011.

Borsányi won four doubles titles on the ITF Circuit. On 1 October 2012, she reached her best singles ranking of world No. 701. On 6 October 2014, she peaked at No. 552 in the doubles rankings.

Borsányi made her WTA Tour main-draw debut at the Budapest Grand Prix in 2006, and was awarded a wildcard to the 2012 Budapest Grand Prix.

ITF Circuit finals

Doubles (4–2)

References

External links
 
 

1987 births
Living people
People from Siófok
Hungarian female tennis players
Baylor Bears women's tennis players
Florida Gators women's tennis players
Sportspeople from Somogy County
21st-century Hungarian women